The Lady of the Lake is a name or a title used by several either fairy or fairy-like but human enchantresses in the Matter of Britain, the body of medieval literature and mythology associated with the legend of King Arthur. They play important roles in many stories, including providing Arthur with the sword Excalibur, eliminating Merlin, raising Lancelot after the death of his father, and helping to take the dying Arthur to Avalon. Different sorceresses known as the Lady of the Lake appear concurrently as separate characters in some versions of the legend since at least the Post-Vulgate Cycle and consequently the seminal Le Morte d'Arthur, with the latter describing them as a hierarchical group, while some texts also give this title to either Morgan or her sister.

Name

Today, the Lady of the Lake is best known as either Nimue, or several scribal variants of Ninianne and Viviane. Medieval authors and copyists produced various forms of the latter, including: Nymenche (in addition to Ninianne / Ninienne) in the Vulgate Lancelot; Nim[i]ane and Ui[n/ui]ane (in addition to Viviane) in the Vulgate Merlin (Niniane in the version Livre d'Artus); Nin[i]eve / Nivene / Niviène / Nivienne and Vivienne in the Post-Vulgate Merlin (Niviana in the Spanish Baladro del Sage Merlin); and Nimiane / Niniame and Vivian / Vivien in Arthour and Merlin and Henry Lovelich's Merlin. Further variations of these include alternate spellings with the letter i written as y, such as in the cases of Nymanne (Nimanne as in Michel le Noir's Merlin) and Nynyane (Niniane).

According to Lucy Paton, the most primitive French form of this name might have been Niniane. The much later form Nimue, in which the letter e can be written as ë or é, was invented and popularized by Thomas Malory through his 15th-century Le Morte d'Arthur and itself has several variations: her name appears as Nymue, Nyneue, Nyneve and Nynyue in William Caxton's print edition, but it had been rather Nynyve (used predominantly) and Nenyve in Malory's original Winchester Manuscript. Even though 'Nymue' (with the m) appears only in the Caxton text, the modernized and standardized 'Nimue' is now the most common form of the name of Malory's character, as Caxton's edition was the only version of Le Morte d'Arthur published until 1947. Nimue is also sometimes rendered by modern writers as Nimuë since Tennyson's 19th-century poem by the same title.

Origins

Arthurian scholar A.O.H. Jarman, following suggestions first made in the 19th century, proposed that the name "Viviane" used in French Arthurian romances were ultimately derived from (and a corruption of) the Welsh word chwyfleian (also spelled hwimleian and chwibleian in medieval Welsh sources), meaning "a wanderer of pallid countenance", which was originally applied as an epithet to the famous prototype of Merlin, a prophetic "wild man" figure Myrddin Wyllt in medieval Welsh poetry. Due to the relative obscurity of the word, it was misunderstood as "fair wanton maiden" and taken to be the name of Myrddin's female captor. Others have linked the name "Nymenche" with the Irish mythology's figure Niamh (an otherworldly woman from the legend of Tír na nÓg), and the name "Niniane" with the Welsh mythology's figure Rhiannon (another otherworldly woman of a Celtic myth), or, as a feminine form of "Ninian", with the likes of the 5th-century saint Ninian and the river Ninian.

Further theories connect her to the Welsh lake fairies known as the Gwragedd Annwn (including a Lady of the Lake unrelated to the legend of Arthur), the Romano-British water goddess Coventina (Covienna), the Irish goddess of the underworld Bé Finn (Bébinn, mother of the hero Fráech), and the North Caucasian goddess Satanaya (Satana) from the Nart sagas: associated with water, Satana helps the Scythian hero Batraz gain his magic sword. Possible prototypes include characters from Geoffrey of Monmouth's Vita Merlini, Merlin's one-time wife Guendoloena, and his sister Ganieda. Another possibility is Diana, the Roman goddess of hunt and nature, the spiritual descent from whom is actually explicitly stated within the French prose narratives; also the mythical Greek sea nymph Thetis, mother of the warrior hero Achilles who similarly provides her son with magical weapons. Laurence Gardner interpreted the Arthurian romances' stated Biblical origins of Lancelot's bloodline by noting the belief about Jesus' purported wife Mary Magdalene's later life in Gaul (today's France) and her death at Aquae Sextiae; he identified her descendant as the 6th century Comtess of Avallon named Viviane del Acqs ("of the water"), whose three daughters (respectively the mothers of Lancelot, of Arthur, and of Gawain) would thus evolve into being known as the ‘Ladies of the Lake’.

Chrétien de Troyes's Lancelot, the Knight of the Cart, the first known story featuring Lancelot as a prominent character, was also the first to mention his upbringing by a fairy in a lake. If it is accepted that the French-German Lanzelet by Ulrich von Zatzikhoven contains elements of a more primitive version of this tale than Chrétien's, the infant Lancelot was spirited away to a lake by a water fairy (merfeine in Old High German) known as the Lady of the Sea and then raised in her Land of Maidens (Meide lant). The fairy queen character and her paradise island in Lanzelet are reminiscent of Morgen (Morgan) of the Island of Avallon (Avalon) in Geoffrey's work. Furthermore, the fairy from Lanzelet has a son named Mabuz, an Anglo-Norman form of the name of Mabon, the son of Morgan's early Welsh counterpart, and reputed prototype, Modron.

Medieval literature

Lancelot's guardian

Following the above mentioned works of Chrétien and Ulrich, the Lady of the Lake began appearing by this title in the French chivalric romance prose by the early 13th century. As a fairy godmother-type foster mother of the hero Lancelot, she inherits the role of an unnamed aquatic fairy queen, her prototype from 12th-century poetry. While Ulrich's Lanzelet uses the changeling part of the fairy abduction lore in regards to Mabuz and Lancelot, the Lady has no offspring of her own in Chrétien's and later versions.

In the Lancelot-Grail (Vulgate) prose cycle, the Lady resides in an otherworldly enchanted realm, the entry to which is disguised as an illusion of a lake (the Post-Vulgate notes it as Merlin's work). There, she raises Lancelot from his infancy having stolen him from his mother following the death of his father, King Ban. She teaches Lancelot arts and writing, infusing him with wisdom and courage, and overseeing his training to become an unsurpassed warrior. She also rears his orphaned cousins Lionel and Bors after having her sorcerous damsel Seraide (Saraïde, later called Celise) rescue them from King Claudas. All this takes her only a few years in the human world. Afterwards, she sends off the adolescent Lancelot to King Arthur's court as the nameless White Knight, due to her own affinity with the color white.

Through much of the Prose Lancelot Propre, the Lady keeps aiding Lancelot in various ways during his early adventures to become a famed knight and discover his true identity, usually acting through her maidens serving as her agents and messengers. She gives him her magical gifts, including a magic ring of protection against enchantments in a manner similar in that to his fairy protectoress in Chrétien's version (the same of another of her magic rings also grants Lancelot's lover Queen Guinevere immunity from Morgan's power in the Prophéties de Merlin). Later she also works to actively encourage Lancelot and Guinevere's relationship and its consummation (this includes sending Guinevere a symbolically illustrated magic shield, the crack in which closes up after the queen finally spends her first night with Lancelot), and furthermore personally arrives to restore Lancelot to sanity during some of his recurring periods of madness.

Merlin's beloved

The Vulgate Cycle is first to tell of either a different or the same Lady of the Lake in the Prose Merlin-derived section. It takes place before its main Vulgate Lancelot section but was written later, linking her with the disappearance of Merlin from the romance tradition of Arthurian legend. She is given the name Viviane (or similar) and a human origin, although she is still being called a fairy. In the Vulgate Merlin, Viviane refuses to give Merlin (who at this time is already old but appears to her in the guise of a handsome young man) her love until he has taught her all his secrets, after which she uses her power to seal him by making him sleep forever. The Post-Vulgate revision changes it into Viviane causing Merlin's death out of her hatred and fear of him. Though Merlin knows beforehand that this will happen due to his power of foresight, he is unable to counteract her because of the 'truth' this ability of foresight holds. He decides to do nothing for his situation other than to continue to teach her his secrets until she takes the opportunity to get rid of him.

Consequently, she entraps and entombs her unresisting mentor within a tree, in a hole underneath a large stone, or inside a cave, depending on the version of this story as it is told in the different texts. In the Prophéties de Merlin, for instance, Viviane is especially cruel in the way she disposes of Merlin and then takes Tristan's brother Meliadus the Younger as her actual lover. There she is proud of how Merlin had never taken her virginity, unlike what happened with his other female students such as Morgan. The Prose Lancelot explains this by a spell she put "on her groin which, as long as it lasted, prevented anyone from deflowering her and having relations with her." The Lancelot too has Viviane leave Merlin for another lover, in this case the evil king Brandin of the Isles, whom she teaches some magic that he then applies to his terrible castle Dolorous Gard; in the Vulgate Merlin, an incognito Viviane abortively turns King Brandegorre's son Evadeam into the deformed Dwarf Knight for refusing her love. Conversely, the Livre d'Artus, a late variant of the Prose Lancelot, shows a completely peaceful scene taking place under a blooming hawthorn tree where Merlin is lovingly put to sleep by Viviane, as it is required by his destined fate that she has learned of. He then wakes up inside an impossibly high and indestructible tower, invisible from the outside, where she will come to meet him there almost every day or night (a motif reminiscent of Ganieda's visits of Merlin's house in an earlier version of his life as described by Geoffrey in Vita Merlini). In any case, as a result of their usually final encounter Merlin almost always either dies or is never seen again by anyone else. Only in the recently found, alternative Bristol Merlin fragment, she resists his seduction with the help of a magic ring during the week they spend together; this particular text ends with him reuniting with Arthur.

According to her backstory in the chronologically later (but happening earlier plotwise) Vulgate Merlin, Viviane was a daughter of the knight Dionas (Dyonas) and a niece of the Duke of Burgundy. She was born in Dionas' domain that included the fairy forests of Briosque (Brocéliande) and Darnantes, and it was an enchantment of her fairy godmother, Diana the Huntress Goddess, that caused Viviane to be so alluring to Merlin when she first met him there as a young teenager. The Vulgate Lancelot informs the reader that, back "in the time of Virgil", Diana had been a Queen of Sicily that was considered a goddess by her subjects. The Post-Vulgate Suite de Merlin describes how Viviane was born and lived in a magnificent castle at the foot of a mountain in Brittany as a daughter of the King of Northumbria. She is initially known as the beautiful 12-years-old Damsel Huntress (Damoiselle Cacheresse) in her introductory episode, in which she serves the role of a damsel in distress in the adventure of the three knights separately sent by Merlin to rescue her from kidnapping; the quest is soon completed by King Pellinore who tracks down and kills her abductor. The Post-Vulgate rewrite also describes how Diana had killed her partner Faunus to be with a man named Felix, but then she was herself killed by her lover at that lake, which came to be called the Lake of Diana (Lac Diane). This is presumably the place where Lancelot du Lac ("of the Lake") is later raised, at first not knowing his real parentage, by Viviane. Nevertheless, in the French romances only the narration of the Vulgate Lancelot actually makes it clear that its Lady of the Lake and Viviane  are in fact the one and same character. There, she also uses other names, including Elaine.

Excalibur giver

Another, unnamed Lady of the Lake appears in the Post-Vulgate tradition to bestow the magic sword Excalibur from Avalon to Arthur in a now iconic scene. She is presented as a mysterious early benefactor of the young King Arthur, who is directed and led to her by Merlin. Appearing in her lake, she grants him Excalibur and its special scabbard after his original (also unnamed) sword breaks in the duel against King Pellinore. Later in the Post-Vulgate Suite du Merlin, this Lady of the Lake is suddenly attacked and beheaded at King Arthur's court by Sir Balin as a result of a kin feud between them (she blames Balin for the death of variably either her brother or her lover, while he blames her for the death of his mother, who had been burned at the stake) and a dispute over another enchanted sword from Avalon; her body later vanishes.

All this takes place during the time when Merlin is still at Arthur's side and prior to the introduction of the young Viviane in the same branch of the Post-Vulgate Cycle. Modern retellings, however, often make her the same character as Viviane, as well as also usually omitting the episode of her apparent killing by Balin.

Other identities and relations
In some cases, it is uncertain whether Morgan and the Lady of the Lake are identical or separate characters. According to Anne Berthelot, Morgan herself is "the Lady of the Lake", as compared to the "upstart magician" Viviane, in the French prose cycles. The 13th/14th-century English poem Of Arthour and of Merlin explicitly gives the role of Lady of the Lake to Morgan, explaining her association with the name "Nimiane" by just having her residing near a town called Nimiane (Ninniane).

The 15th-century Italian prose La Tavola Ritonda (The Round Table) makes the Lady a daughter of Uther Pendragon and thus a sister to both Morgan (Fata Morgana) and Arthur. Here she is a character mischievous to the extent that her own brother Arthur swears to burn her at the stake (as he also threatens to do with Morgan). This version of her briefly kidnaps Lancelot when he is an adult (along with Guinevere and Tristan and Isolde), a motif usually associated with Morgan; here it is also Morgan herself who sends the shield to Guinevere in an act recast as having malicious intent. The Lady is also described as Morgan's sister in some other Italian texts, such as the 13th-century poem Pulzella Gaia. Mike Ashley identified Viviane with one of Arthur's other sisters, the otherwise obscure Elaine.

In the 14th-century French prose romance Perceforest, a lengthy romance prequel to the Arthurian legend, the figures of the Lady of the Lake and of the enchantress Sebile have been merged to create the character of Sebile [the Lady] of the Lake (Sébil[l]e [la Dame] du Lac, named as such due to her residence of the Castle of the Lake later known as the Red Castle), who is depicted as an ancestor of Arthur himself from her romance with King Alexander (Alexander the Great). The Lady of the Lake who raises Lancelot is also mentioned in Perceforest, where both hers and Merlin's ancestry lines are derived from the descendants of the ancient Fairy Morgane (Morg[u]ane la Faee / la Fée, living in a castle on the Isle of Zeeland) that were born from an illicit love between her beautiful daughter Morg[u]anette and Passelion, an amorous young human protégé of the spirit Zephir.

Le Morte d'Arthur

In Thomas Malory's 15th-century compilation of Arthurian stories, the first Lady of the Lake remains unnamed besides this epithet. When the young King Arthur, accompanied by his mentor Merlin, comes to her lake, she holds the replacement Excalibur (the original sword-from-the-stone having been recently broken in battle) out of the water and offers it to Arthur if he promises to fulfill any request from her later, to which he agrees. Later, when the Lady comes to Camelot to receive her end of the bargain, she asks for the head of Sir Balin the Savage, whom she blames for her brother's death. However, Arthur refuses this request. Instead it is Balin, claiming that "by enchantment and sorcery she has been the destroyer of many good knights", who swiftly decapitates her with his own magic sword (a cursed blade that had been stolen by him from a mysterious lady from Avalon just a moment earlier) in front of Arthur and then sends off his squire with her severed head, much to the distress and shame of the king under whose protection she should have been there. Arthur gives the Lady a rich burial, has her slayer banished despite Merlin telling him Balin would become Arthur's greatest knight, and gives his permission for Sir Launcenor of Ireland (an Irish prince similarly named but entirely unrelated to Malory's Lancelot written as Launcelot, who is not yet introduced in the story) to go after Balin to avenge this disgrace by killing him.

Nimue (Nyneve)

The second Lady of the Lake is sometimes referred to by her title and sometimes referred to by name, Nimue (Nynyve in Malory's original Winchester Manuscript). Nimue, whom Malory describes as the "chief Lady of the Lake", plays a pivotal role in the Arthurian court throughout his story. The first time the character named Nimue appears is at the wedding of Arthur and Guinevere, as the young huntress rescued by Pellinore. She then proceeds to perform some of the same actions as the Lady of the Lake of his sources but is different in some ways. For instance, in the Post-Vulgate Suite du Merlin, Malory's source for the earlier parts of Le Morte d'Arthur, the Lady of the Lake traps Merlin in a tomb, which results in his death. She does this out of cruelty and a hatred of Merlin. In Le Morte d'Arthur, on the other hand, Nimue is still the one to trap Merlin, but Malory gives her a sympathetic reason: Merlin falls in love with her and will not leave her alone; Malory gives no indication that Nimue loves him back. Eventually, since she cannot free herself of him otherwise, she decides to trap him under rock and makes sure he cannot escape. She is tired of his sexual advances, and afraid of his power as "a devil's son", so she does not have much of a choice but to ultimately get rid of him.

After enchanting Merlin, Malory's Nimue replaces him as Arthur's magician aide and trusted adviser. When Arthur himself is in need in Malory's text, some incarnation of the Lady of the Lake, or her magic, or her agent, reaches out to help him. For instance, she saves Arthur from a magical attempt on his life made by his sister Morgan le Fay and from the death at the hands of Morgan's lover Accolon as in the Post-Vulgate, and together with Tristan frees Arthur from the lustful sorceress Annowre in a motif taken from the Prose Tristan. In Malory's version, Brandin of the Isles, renamed Brian (Bryan), is Nimue's evil cousin rather than her paramour. Nimue instead becomes the lover and eventually wife of Pelleas, a gentle young knight whom she then also puts under her protection so "that he was never slain by her days."

In an analysis by Kenneth Hodges, Nimue appears through the story as the chivalric code changes, hinting to the reader that something new will happen in order to help the author achieve the wanted interpretation of the Arthurian legend: each time the Lady reappears in Le Morte d'Arthur, it is at a pivotal moment of the episode, establishing the importance of her character within Arthurian literature, as she transcends any notoriety attached to her character by aiding Arthur and other knights to succeed in their endeavors, subtly helping sway the court in the right direction. According to Hodges, when Malory was looking at other texts to find inspiration, he chose the best aspects of all the other Lady of the Lake characters, making her pragmatic, compassionate, clever, and strong-willed. However, Nimue's character is often seen as still very ambiguous by other scholars. As summarized by Amy S. Kaufman,

Malory does not use Nimue's name for the Lady of the Lake associated with Lancelot, who remains unnamed as well and may be considered a third one (it is possible that Malory had only access to the Suite du Merlin part of the Post-Vulgate Cycle as a relevant source). In the end, a female hand emerging from a lake reclaims Excalibur in a miraculous scene when the sword is thrown into the water by Sir Bedivere just after Arthur's final battle. The narration then counts Nimue among the magical queens who arrive in a black boat with Morgan. Together, they bear the mortally wounded Arthur away to Avalon. (In the original account in the Vulgate Cycle's Mort Artu, the chief lady in the boat, seen holding hands with Morgan and calling for Arthur, is not recognised by Girflet who here is this scene's witness instead of Bedivere.)

Her lake 

A number of locations are traditionally associated with the Lady of the Lake's abode. Such places within Great Britain include the lakes Dozmary Pool and The Loe in Cornwall, the lakes Llyn Llydaw and Llyn Ogwen in Snowdonia, River Brue's area of Pomparles Bridge in Somerset, and the lake Loch Arthur in Scotland.

In France, Viviane is also connected with Brittany's Paimpont forest, often identified as the Arthurian enchanted forest of Brocéliande, where her lake (that is, the Lake of Diana) is said to be located at the castle Château de Comper. The oldest localization of the Lake is in the Lancelot en prose, written around 1230: the place where Lancelot is raised is described there as to the north of Trèves-Cunault, on the Loire, in the middle of the (now extinct) forest of Beaufort-en-Vallée (the "Bois en Val" of the book).

Modern culture 

Walter Scott wrote an influential poem, The Lady of the Lake, in 1810, drawing on the romance of the legend, but with an entirely different story set around Loch Katrine in the Trossachs of Scotland. Scott's material furnished subject matter for La donna del lago, an 1819 opera by Gioachino Rossini. Franz Schubert set seven songs from Walter Scott's Lady of the Lake, including the three "Ellen songs" ("Ellens Gesang I", "Ellens Gesang II", and "Ellens Gesang III"), although Schubert's music to Ellen's third song has become far more famous in its later adaptation, known as "Ave Maria". 

The full French name of the University of Notre Dame, founded in 1842, is Notre Dame du Lac. This is translated as "Our Lady of the Lake", making reference to Mary, mother of Jesus as the Lady of the Lake in a fusion between Arthurian legend and French Catholicism.

Alfred, Lord Tennyson adapted several stories of the Lady of the Lake for his 1859–1885 poetic cycle Idylls of the King. He splits her into two characters: Viviane is a Circe-like deceitful villain and an associate of King Mark and Mordred who ensnares Merlin, while the Lady of the Lake is a guardian angel style benevolent figure who raises Lancelot and gives Arthur his sword.

Popular culture

Modern authors of Arthurian fiction adapt the Lady of the Lake legend in various ways, often using two or more bearers of the title while others choose to emphasize a single character. Influenced by her story, fantasy writers tend to give their Merlin a sorcerous female enemy, usually either Nimue, Morgan (often perceived as more plausible in this role due to her established enmity with Arthur in much of the legend), or Morgan's sister Morgause. Various characters of the Lady (or Ladies) of the Lake appear in many works, including poems, novels, films, television series, stage productions, comics, and games. Though her identity may change, her role as a significant figure in the lives of Arthur and Merlin usually remains consistent. Some examples of such works are listed below.

Nimue appears in T. H. White's book series The Once and Future King as a water nymph and Merlin's enchantress. True to the legend she traps Merlin in a cave, but White's Merlyn does not convey it as negative, and even refers to it as a holiday. They thus disappear together near the beginning of The Ill-Made Knight (1940), however Merlyn later returns in The Book of Merlyn.

Nineue ferch Afallach, "Tennyson's Vivien", is a fairy enchantress in John Cowper Powys's novel Porius: A Romance of the Dark Ages (1951). In Welsh mythology, Modron ("divine mother") was a daughter of Avallach; she was derived from the Gaulish goddess Matrona and may have been the prototype of Morgan. The novel ends with the protagonist Porius saving the wizard Myrddin (the story's Merlin figure) from his entombment by Nineue on the summit of Snowdon, Wales' highest mountain.

The 1960 musical Camelot includes the character Nimue who has a song called "Follow Me" performed in Act I. In the play, Nimue, a beautiful water nymph, has come to draw Merlyn into her cave for an eternal sleep. He begs Nimue for answers, as he has forgotten if he has warned Arthur about Lancelot and Mordred, before his memories fade permanently and he is led away. She does not appear in the film adaptation, but "Follow Me" is echoed in the notably similar "Come with Me" sung by the Lady of the Lake for Galahad in the later musical Spamalot (2005).

The Lady of the Lake is satirized off-screen in the 1975 comedy film Monty Python and the Holy Grail, in which late 20th century notions are inserted into a mythic tale for comical effect. In a famous scene, a peasant named Dennis says, "Strange women lying in ponds distributing swords is no basis for a system of government. Supreme executive power derives from a mandate from the masses, not from some farcical aquatic ceremony." Arthurian scholar N. J. Higham described this iconic dialogue line as ever "immortal" in 2005.

In the DC Comics Universe, Vivienne is the Lady of the Lake. Nimue is the good Madame Xanadu (introduced in 1978), her youngest sister, and their middle sister is the evil Morgaine le Fey (given name Morgana); their surname is Inwudu. The Lady of the Lake has appeared in Hellblazer, Aquaman, and her sister's own series. In the 1983 DC Comics series Camelot 3000, an unrelated Lady of the Lake is referred to as Nyneve, depicted as a woman with a beautiful body but wearing a mask, whom sends to confront the heroes of Camelot. When Nyneve removes the mask, Merlin, upon seeing her face, is unable to resist her and departs, thus removing him from Morgan's path. Later, when he escapes her control, it is revealed that her only facial feature is a gigantic mouth with a long serpentine tongue, vagina dentata style, which Merlin turns against her.

Mary Stewart's 1979 novel The Last Enchantment in her Arthurian Saga series radically recasts the story of Merlin and Niniane (Nimue), completely removing the aspect of malicious seduction and treachery dominant in the traditional version; it is the witch Morgause, the mother of Mordred (with Mordred notably undergoing a similarly revisionist treatment as Nimue), who takes Nimue's traditional role and then continues as the chief villain. In this depiction, after she saves him from being poisoned by Morgause, Merlin takes Niniane on as an apprentice, with her at first disguised as a boy named Ninian, and willingly teaches her his magic, which he had refused to Morgause. When her identity as a woman is discovered, they fall in love despite their age difference. Their love is peaceful and idyllic; even when Nimue marries Pelleas, this is not a betrayal of Merlin. As Merlin gives her the secrets of his power and how to control it, he seems to lose them himself, which he does not mind. In a depleted, weakened condition, he falls into a coma, and is believed to be dead. Nimue has him buried within his "crystal cave", from which he escapes after a few weeks, through a combination of chance luck and ingenious planning, and travels incognito to let Arthur know he is still alive and can help him against Morgause and Morgan. Nimue takes Merlin's place as the court enchanter, while Merlin retires to the crystal cave and lives a quiet and happy life as a hermit. Niniane takes his place and role to the degree she even proclaims "I am Merlin", thus creating a 'Nimue-Merlin' character. 

In John Boorman's 1981 film Excalibur, an uncredited actress plays the Lady of Lake, twice holding up the fabled sword, once for Merlin to give to Uther Pendragon, and once to return to Arthur. Separately, the film's Morgana (Helen Mirren) takes on other parts of the traditional Lady of the Lake story, learning the occult arts from Merlin and ultimately trapping him with his own powerful "Charm of Making", the magic of shapeshifting.

Marion Zimmer Bradley's 1983 novel The Mists of Avalon, a feminist retelling of the legend, expands on the tradition of multiple Ladies, with Viviane, Niniane and Nimue all being separate characters. Furthermore, in Bradley's works, both the 'Lady of the Lake' and the 'Merlin' are names of offices in the Celtic pagan hierarchy: the Lady of the Lake is the title of the ruling priestess of Avalon, and the Merlin is a druid who has pledged his life to the protection of Britain. Various tragic characters assume the title of the Lady of the Lake, including Viviane, the initial High Priestess of Avalon, Arthur's aunt, and Lancelot's mother who ends up killed by Balin (here as her other son Balan's foster-brother); Niniane, Taliesin's daughter and yet another of Arthur's half-sisters who reluctantly becomes the Lady of the Lake after Viviane is slain and becomes Mordred's lover until he kills her; the main protagonist and narrator Morgaine (Morgan), portrayed similar as in the medieval romances but more sympathetically; and Nimue, a sympathetic and tragic young priestess who falls in love with the Merlin but is duty bound by Morgaine to seduce and lure him to his death – following which she drowns herself. Their ancestors (the previous priestesses of Avalon and, before that, of Atlantis) are subjects of Bradley's extended Avalon universe novels, among them the direct prequel Lady of Avalon (1997), the third part of which follows the young Viviane. In 2001, a television adaptation of The Mists of Avalon starred Anjelica Huston as Viviane and Julianna Margulies and Tamsin Egerton as Morgaine.

In his Christian-themed 1987–1999 book series The Pendragon Cycle, Stephen Lawhead takes up the figure of the Lady of the Lake under a different name: the Faery princess Charis, daughter of Avallach, the king of Atlantis and later of Avalon. Married to the Breton prince Taliesin, she gives birth to Merlin. After Taliesin's death, Charis takes care of Merlin at Lake Logres, hence her name "Lady of the Lake". She is the protagonist and narrator of the first book in the cycle, Taliesin. The traditional figure of Nimue belongs to Charis' shapeshifting evil sister Morgian (Morgan), the main antagonist through the entire series, including the modern-day-set Avalon: The Return of King Arthur.

In Bernard Cornwell's 1995–1997 novel series The Warlord Chronicles, more historically-grounded and realistic than usual treatments of Arthurian legend, Nimue is an Irish orphan adopted by the British druid Merlin. She is a prominent character in the books, being a childhood friend of, a major love interest for, and finally an adversary to the series' main protagonist, Arthur's warrior Derfel Cadarn. She begins as Merlin's most adept priestess and lover, but as she grows ever more brutal and fanatical, by the time of the final novel she will turns against him and imprisons him, torturing him to reveal the last of his magical secrets in her desperate obsession to bring back the Old Gods of Britain at any price. Eventually, she brings Merlin to total madness before ultimately sacrificing him to their lost gods, whose return she believes would rid the island of the Saxons and the Christians alike. As Nimue believes the key to her goal is to sacrifice Gwydre, Arthur's son with Guinevere using Excalibur (as she already did with Gawain), Derfel's final act of casting the sword away is not to return it to her but to hide it from her forever. Stephen Thomas Knight, commenting on Cornwell's vicious Nimue, with her tunnel-vision ruthlessness, vindicativeness, and frequent use of prolonged torture, opined the "pro-Celtic quasi-historian" author "links her to the Saxons as part of her hostility to decent people, including Merlin." Symbolically, both Nimue and the hypocritical Bishop Sansum, representing the Christian side of the books' major theme of the danger of religious extremism, remain still alive as the story comes to the end. Nimue is due to be portrayed by Ellie James in the upcoming television adaptation The Winter King.

In the 1995–1996 animated series Princess Gwenevere and the Jewel Riders, the name of the first season's antagonist Lady Kale (voiced by Corinne Orr), an evil twin sister of the Queen of Avalon and a former student of Merlin who magically imprisons him, was created as an anagram of Lady of the Lake. Kale ruthlessly tries to take control of Merlin's own magic so she can rule Avalon forever, later working together with the also evil Morgana. However, a good character of the Lady of the Lake (or the 'Spirit of Avalon' in an alternate version Starla and the Jewel Riders) herself briefly appears during the second seasons's finale in the eponymous episode "Lady of the Lake" ("Spirit of Avalon") to help the protagonist Princes Gwenevere save Avalon from Kale (defeated in it personally by Gwenevere) and Morgana.

In the 1998 television miniseries Merlin, the characters of the Lady of the Lake (Miranda Richardson) and Nimue (Isabella Rossellini) are separated, with the former being a goddess-like beneficent fae who is the twin sister of the evil Queen Mab, and the latter being a noblewoman damsel in distress with no supernatural powers who is the object of Merlin's affections. In the motif evoking Edwin Arlington Robinson's 1917 poem Merlin, the Lady of the Lake and Merlin live together in another world until he leaves in order to help Arthur; in the end, however, Merlin returns to her and makes them both young again with the last of his magic. In the 2006 pseudo-sequel Merlin's Apprentice, Miranda Richardson reprises her role as the Lady of the Lake, as the only returning cast member aside of Merlin's Sam Neill, though she portrays a much different characterization: the Lady is the main antagonist seeking to destroy Camelot. It also depicts Merlin's sleep in the cave; as he slept, the Lady used her magic to conceive a son with Merlin and then enchanted him to sleep for 50 years.

In the 2005–2009 television series Kaamelott, the Lady of the Lake (Audrey Fleurot) is an angel sent to help King Arthur progress in the quest for the Grail. Upending the established connections, the series' Lancelot not only never interacts with the Lady but cannot even see her.

The 2008–2012 television series Merlin also features two characters based on the Lady of the Lake. Nimueh (Michelle Ryan) serves as the primary antagonist of the show's first season, which includes the episode titled "The Mark of Nimueh". The character has no connection to Merlin beyond his opposition to her plans, and her only connection to a lake is her use of a location called the Isle of the Blessed (Thomas Wentworth Higginson's 19th-century name for Avalon). She ends up killed by Merlin in a showdown on her Isle of Nimueh in the season's last episode, "Le Morte d'Arthur". The ninth episode of the second season is titled "The Lady of the Lake", wherein a sorceress named Freya (Laura Donnelly) dies and vows to repay Merlin for his kindness to her. In the third season finale, Freya, now a water spirit, returns Excalibur to Merlin so that he can give it to Prince Arthur Pendragon.

Nimue, the Blood Queen, appears as one of the primary antagonists in the Hellboy comic book series by Mike Mignola, influenced by the classic comics series Prince Valiant, where she was introduced in 2008 as a witch who driven mad after the powers she acquired from Merlin gave her knowledge of the Ogdru Jahad, prompting the witches of Britain to dismember her and seal her away underground. Resurrected in the present day by King Arthur's last descendant, Hellboy, she assumes the mantle of the Irish triple war goddess the Morrígan and assembles an army of legendary and folkloric beings to eradicate mankind, only to stopped by Hellboy at the cost of his own life. Although having been turned into an evil creature trying to destroy the word, Nimue still had a human part "that hated and feared what she had become." She is portrayed by Milla Jovovich in the 2019 film adaptation Hellboy.

Nimue is featured in the 2010s television series Once Upon a Time in which Arthurian characters live in the land inhabited by other fairy tale characters. She appears as the main antagonist in the first half of Season 5, initially portrayed by Jacqui Ainsley. She is introduced in the eponymous episode "Nimue" when, fleeing from Vortigan who sacked and burned her village, she meets Merlin and they fall in love; with Merlin being immortal, Nimue drinks from the Holy Grail so they can be together forever. Afterwards, she kills Vortigan, which darkens her magic and turns her into the very first Dark One. Nimue breaks Excalibur but Merlin cannot brings himself to kill her and ends up being trapped in a tree. At some point, Nimue dies but she manages to live on in all of the following Dark Ones, appearing to them as a vision. She forms an alliance with Captain Hook, manipulating him into casting the Dark Curse and reviving her and the Dark Ones, and then leads a Dark One invasion in Storybrooke, which ultimately leads to her demise at the hands of Hook, who betrays her to redeem himself and destroy her and the Dark Ones forever using Excalibur. At this time, she was played by a male actor, Guy Fauchon. The separate character of the Lady of the Lake is referenced as Lancelot's mother, but she never appears; even the episode titled "The Lady of the Lake" does not feature her and its title instead refers to Prince Charming's mother.

The 2017 film King Arthur: Legend of the Sword features the Lady of the Lake (Jacqui Ainsley) bound Excalibur to the Pendragon bloodline after Merlin used it to destroy the Mage Tower and appears to catch the sword underwater after Arthur throws it into the lake in shame at his failures; she pulls Arthur underwater and motivates him to fight Vortigern before returning the sword to him. This good Lady of the Lake has her mirror image in the film's monstrous character "Syren" that replaces the two dragons in the film's revision of the legend of Vortigern's Tower.

In the 2020 television series Cursed, a feminist re-imagining of the Arthurian legend based on an illustrated novel od the same title, Nimue is the protagonist, portrayed by Katherine Langford in the adaptation. Writer and showrunner Tom Wheeler said he was inspired by "this really evocative image of this young woman’s hand reaching out of this lake and offering the sword to Arthur, so that image is what captivated us. And it's a really mysterious, magical, sad image, and it begged all of these questions: Why is she giving the sword to Arthur? What was their relationship? Why him? Why does she have the sword?" (Contrary to Wheeler's stated belief, it is not Nimue who gives the sword in Malory's unrevised telling.) In Cursed, before becoming the Lady of the Lake, Nimue, also known as the "Wolf-Blood Witch", is a young woman coming into her Fey abilities, but whilst her home was ravaged by the Christian fanatics called the Red Paladins she is sent on a mission by her dying mother to deliver "The Sword of Power" (Excalibur but never named) to Merlin. Taking great liberties from the source materials, Cursed'''s Lancelot (known until the finale as only "The Weeping Monk") is already adult when Nimue first meets him and is for most part just one of her enemies, Merlin is revealed to be her father, and she is instead Arthur's love interest. The story of Cursed'' ends abruptly when Nimue is shot with arrows by a nun named Iris (an original character with no counterpart in the legend) and falls with the sword into a body of water, where she (or her spirit, as her exact fate is left unexplained) will guard the sword until "a true king rises to claim it." Albeit the TV series adapted the entire original book, it was supposed to continue in the canceled second season.

See also 
Grendel's mother
Llyn y Fan Fach
Yeshe Tsogyal

References

External links
The Lady of the Lake and Vivien at The Camelot Project

Arthurian characters
British poems
Fairies
Female characters in literature
Female characters in television
Female legendary creatures
Fictional lords and ladies
Fictional characters who use magic
Mythological queens
Supernatural legends